Trachycephalus lepidus is a species of frogs in the family Hylidae endemic to Brazil.
Its natural habitat is subtropical or tropical moist lowland forests. It is threatened by habitat loss. This species was previously within the genus Phrynohyas, which was recently synonymized with Trachycephalus.

Sources

Trachycephalus
Endemic fauna of Brazil
Frogs of South America
Amphibians described in 2003
Taxonomy articles created by Polbot